JavaFX is a software platform for creating and delivering desktop applications, as well as rich web applications that can run across a wide variety of devices. JavaFX has support for desktop computers and web browsers on Microsoft Windows, Linux, and macOS, as well as mobile devices                                        running iOS and Android.

On desktops, JavaFX supports Windows Vista, Windows 7, Windows 8, Windows 10, macOS and Linux operating systems. Beginning with JavaFX 1.2, Oracle has released beta versions for OpenSolaris. On mobile, JavaFX Mobile 1.x is capable of running on multiple mobile operating systems, including Symbian OS, Windows Mobile, and proprietary real-time operating systems.

JavaFX was intended to replace Swing as the standard GUI library for Java SE, but it has been dropped from new Standard Editions while Swing and AWT remain included, supposedly because JavaFX's marketshare has been "eroded by the rise of 'mobile first' and 'web first applications." With the release of JDK 11 in 2018, Oracle made JavaFX part of the OpenJDK under the OpenJFX project, in order to increase the pace of its development. Oracle support for JavaFX is also available for Java JDK 8 through March 2025.

Open-source JavaFXPorts works for iOS (iPhone and iPad) and Android and embedded (Raspberry Pi); and the related commercial software created under the name "Gluon" supports the same mobile platforms with additional features plus desktop. This allows a single source code base to create applications for the desktop, iOS, and Android devices.

Features 

JavaFX 1.1 was based on the concept of a "common profile" that is intended to span across all devices supported by JavaFX. This approach makes it possible for developers to use a common programming model while building an application targeted for both desktop and mobile devices and to share much of the code, graphics assets and content between desktop and mobile versions. To address the need for tuning applications on a specific class of devices, the JavaFX 1.1 platform includes APIs that are desktop or mobile-specific. For example, the JavaFX Desktop profile includes Swing and advanced visual effects.

For the end user, the "Drag-to-Install" feature enables them to drag a JavaFX widget - an application residing in a website - and drop it onto their desktop. The application will not lose its state or context even after the browser is closed. An application can also be re-launched by clicking on a shortcut that gets created automatically on the user's desktop.
This behavior is enabled out-of-the-box by the Java applet mechanism since the Java 6u10 update, and is leveraged by JavaFX from the underlying Java layer.
Sun touts "Drag-to-Install" as opening up of a new distribution model and allowing developers to "break away from the browser".

JavaFX 1.x included a set of plug-ins for Adobe Photoshop and Illustrator that enable advanced graphics to be integrated directly into JavaFX applications. The plug-ins generate JavaFX Script code that preserves the layers and structure of the graphics. Developers can then add animation or effects to the static graphics imported. There is also an SVG graphics converter tool (also known as Media Factory) that allows for importing graphics and previewing assets after the conversion to JavaFX format.

Before version 2.0 of JavaFX, developers used a statically typed, declarative language called JavaFX Script to build JavaFX applications. Because JavaFX Script was compiled to Java bytecode, programmers could also use Java code instead. JavaFX applications could run on any desktop that could run Java SE.

JavaFX 2.0 and later is implemented as a "native" Java library, and applications using JavaFX are written in "native" Java code. JavaFX Script has been scrapped by Oracle, but development is being continued in the Visage project. JavaFX 2.x does not support the Solaris operating system or mobile phones; however, Oracle plans to integrate JavaFX to Java SE Embedded 8, and Java FX for ARM processors is in developer preview phase.

Sun Microsystems licensed a custom typeface called Amble for use on JavaFX-powered devices. The font family was designed by mobile user interface design specialists Punchcut and is available as part of the JavaFX SDK 1.3 Release.

WebView 

WebView, the embedded browser component, supports the following HTML5 features:

 Canvas
 Media playback
 Form controls (except for <input type="color"> )
 Editable content
 History maintenance
 Support for the <meter> and <progress> tags
 Support for the <details> and <summary> tags
 DOM
 MathML
 SVG
 CSS
 JavaScript
 Support for domain names written in national languages

JavaFX Mobile 

JavaFX Mobile was the implementation of the JavaFX platform for rich web applications aimed at mobile devices. JavaFX Mobile 1.x applications can be developed in the same language, JavaFX Script, as JavaFX 1.x applications for browser or desktop, and using the same tools: JavaFX SDK and the JavaFX Production Suite. This concept makes it possible to share code-base and graphics assets for desktop and mobile applications. Through integration with Java ME, the JavaFX applications have access to capabilities of the underlying handset, such as the filesystem, camera, GPS, bluetooth or accelerometer.

An independent application platform built on Java, JavaFX Mobile is capable of running on multiple mobile operating systems, including Android, Windows Mobile, and proprietary real-time operating systems.

JavaFX Mobile was publicly available as part of the JavaFX 1.1 release announced by Sun Microsystems on February 12, 2009.

Sun planned to enable out-of-the-box support of JavaFX on the devices by working with handset manufacturers and mobile operators to preload the JavaFX Mobile runtime on the handsets. JavaFX Mobile running on an Android was demonstrated at JavaOne 2008 and selected partnerships (incl. LG Electronics, Sony Ericsson) were announced at the JavaFX Mobile launch in February, 2009.

Components 

JavaFX 2.x platform includes the following components:

 The JavaFX SDK: runtime tools. Graphics, media web services, and rich text libraries. Java FX 1.x also included JavaFX compiler, which is now obsolete as JavaFX user code is written in Java.
 NetBeans IDE for JavaFX: NetBeans with drag-and-drop palette to add objects with transformations, effects and animations plus a set of samples and best practices. For JavaFX 2 support you need at least NetBeans 7.1.1. For Eclipse users there is a community-supported plugin hosted on e(fx)clipse.
 JavaFX scene builder: This was introduced for Java FX 2.1 and later. A user interface (UI) is created by dragging and dropping controls from a palette. This information is saved as an FXML file, a special XML format.
 Tools and plugins for creative tools (a.k.a. Production Suite): Plugins for Adobe Photoshop and Adobe Illustrator that can export graphics assets to JavaFX Script code, tools to convert SVG graphics into JavaFX Script code and preview assets converted to JavaFX from other tools (currently not supported in JavaFX 2.x versions)

History

Early releases 

JavaFX Script, the scripting component of JavaFX, began life as a project by Chris Oliver called F3.

Sun Microsystems first announced JavaFX at the JavaOne Worldwide Java Developer conference in May 2007.

In May 2008 Sun Microsystems announced plans to deliver JavaFX for the browser and desktop by the third quarter of 2008, and JavaFX for mobile devices in the second quarter of 2009. Sun also announced a multi-year agreement with On2 Technologies to bring comprehensive video capabilities to the JavaFX product family using the company's TrueMotion Video codec. Since end of July 2008, developers could download a preview of the JavaFX SDK for Windows and Macintosh, as well as the JavaFX plugin for NetBeans 6.1.

Major releases since JavaFX 1.1 have a release name based on a street or neighborhood in San Francisco. Update releases typically do not have a release name.

On December 4, 2008, Sun released JavaFX 1.0.2.

JavaFX for mobile development was finally made available as part of the JavaFX 1.1 release (named Franca) announced officially on February 12, 2009.

JavaFX 1.2 (named Marina) was released at JavaOne on June 2, 2009. This release introduced:

 Beta support for Linux and Solaris
 Built-in controls and layouts
 Skinnable CSS controls
 Built-in chart widgets
 JavaFX I/O management, masking differences between desktop and mobile devices
 Speed improvements
 Windows Mobile Runtime with Sun Java Wireless Client

JavaFX 1.3 (named Soma) was released on April 22, 2010. This release introduced:

 Performance improvements
 Support of additional platforms
 Improved support for user interface controls

JavaFX 1.3.1 was released on August 21, 2010. This release introduced:

 Quick startup time of JavaFX application
 Custom progress bar for application startup

JavaFX 2.0 (named Presidio) was released on October 10, 2011. This release introduced:

 A new set of Java APIs opening JavaFX capabilities to all Java developers, without the need for them to learn a new scripting language. Java FX Script support was dropped permanently.
 Support for high performance lazy binding, binding expressions, bound sequence expressions, and partial bind re-evaluation.
 Dropping support for JavaFX Mobile.
 Oracle announcing its intent to open-source JavaFX.
 JavaFX runtime turning to be platform-specific, utilizing system capabilities, as video codec available on the system; instead of implementing only one cross-platform runtime as with JavaFX 1.x.

Various improvements have been made within the JavaFX libraries for multithreading. The Task APIs have been updated to support much more concise threading capabilities (i.e. the JavaTaskBase class is no longer necessary since all the APIs are in Java, and the requirement to have a callback interface and Java implementation class are no longer necessary). In addition, the scene graph has been designed to allow scenes to be constructed on background threads and then attached to "live" scenes in a threadsafe manner.

On May 26, 2011, Oracle released the JavaFX 2.0 Beta. The beta release was only made available for 32 and 64 bit versions of Microsoft Windows XP, Windows Vista and Windows 7. An Early Access version for Mac OS X was also available for members of the JavaFX Partner Program at the time, while Linux support was planned for a future release of JavaFX. JavaFX 2.0 was released with only Windows support. Mac OS X support was added with JavaFX 2.1. Linux support was added with JavaFX 2.2.

JavaFX 2.0 makes use of a new declarative XML language called FXML.

On April 27, 2012, Oracle released version 2.1 of JavaFX, which includes the following main features:

 First official version for OS X (desktop only)
 H.264/MPEG-4 AVC and Advanced Audio Coding support
 CoolType text
 UI enhancements including combo box controls, charts (stacked chart), and menu bars
 Webview component now allows JavaScript to make calls to Java methods

On August 14, 2012, Oracle released version 2.2 of JavaFX, which includes the following main features:

 Linux support (including plugin and webstart)
 Canvas
 New controls: Color Picker, Pagination
 HTTP Live Streaming support
 Touch events and gestures
 Image manipulation API
 Native Packaging

JavaFX 2.2 adds new packaging option called Native Packaging, allowing packaging of an application as a "native bundle". This gives users a way to install and run an application without any external dependencies on a system JRE or FX SDK.

As of Oracle Java SE 7 update 6 and Java FX 2.2, JavaFX is bundled to be installed with Oracle Java SE platform.

Releases after version bump 

JavaFX is now part of the JRE/JDK for Java 8 (released on March 18, 2014) and has the same numbering, i.e., JavaFX 8.

JavaFX 8 adds several new features, including:

 Support for 3D graphics
 Sensor support
 MathML support, with JavaFX 8 Update 192
 Printing and rich text support
 Generic dialog templates via inclusion of ControlsFX to replace JOptionPane as of JavaFX 8u40

JavaFX 9 features were centered on extracting some useful private APIs from the JavaFX code to make these APIs public:

 JEP 253: Prepare JavaFX UI Controls and CSS APIs for Modularization

Oracle announced their intention to stop shipping JavaFX with JDK 11 and later. It is no longer bundled with the latest version.

JavaFX 11 was first shipped in September 2018.

 JavaFX 11.0.2 is the latest public release of JavaFX 11.
 JavaFX 11.0.16 is the latest release of JavaFX 11 for those with a long-term support contract.
 MathML support, with JavaFX 11
 FX Robot API

JavaFX 12 was first shipped in March 2019.

 JavaFX 12.0.1.

JavaFX 13 shipped in September 2019.

JavaFX 14 was released in March 2020.

JavaFX 15 was released in September 2020.

JavaFX 16 was released in March 2021.

JavaFX 17 was released in September 2021.

JavaFX 18 was released in March 2022.

JavaFX 19 was released in September 2022.

Future work 

Oracle also announced in November 2012 the open sourcing of Decora, a DSL Shader language for JavaFX allowing to generate Shaders for OpenGL and Direct3D.

Oracle wrote in its Client Support Roadmap that JavaFX new fixes will continue to be supported on Java SE 8 through March 2025. Previously, Oracle announced that they are "working with interested third parties to make it easier to build and maintain JavaFX as a separately distributable open-source module." JavaFX will continue to be supported in the future by the company Gluon as a downloadable module in addition to the JDK.

Availability 

As of March 2014 JavaFX is deployed on Microsoft Windows, OS X, and Linux. Oracle has an internal port of JavaFX on iOS and Android. Support for ARM is available starting with JavaFX 8 On February 11, 2013, Richard Bair, chief architect of the Client Java Platform at Oracle, announced that Oracle would open-source the iOS and Android implementations of its JavaFX platform in the next two months.

Starting with version 8u33 of JDK for ARM, support for JavaFX Embedded has been removed.

Support will continue for x86-based architectures.

A commercial port of JavaFX for Android and iOS has been created under the name "Gluon".

License 

There are various licenses for the modules that compose the JavaFX runtime:

 The JavaFX compiler and an older version of the 2D Scene graph are released under a GPL v2 license,
 The NetBeans plugin for JavaFX is dual licensed under GPL v2 and CDDL.

During development, Sun explained they will roll out their strategy for the JavaFX licensing model for JavaFX first release. After the release in 2008, Jeet Kaul, Sun's Vice president for Client Software, explained that they will soon publish a specification for JavaFX and its associated file formats, and will continue to open-source the JavaFX runtime, and decouple this core from the proprietary parts licensed by external parties.

At JavaOne 2011, Oracle Corporation announced that JavaFX 2.0 would become open-source. Since December 2011, Oracle began to open-source the JavaFX code under the GPL+linking exception.

In December 2012, new portions of the JavaFX source code were open-sourced by Oracle:

 the animations and timelines classes
 the event delivery mechanism and other various core classes
 the render tree interface, and the implementation of this interface
 the geometry and shapes implementation
 the java part of the rendering engine used in the rendering pipeline
 the logging support

See also 

 Curl (programming language)
 JavaFX Script
 Standard Widget Toolkit

References

Bibliography

External links 

 
 JavaFX Tutorial

Java (programming language)
Oracle software
Rich web application frameworks
Sun Microsystems software
Articles with example Java code